Larisa Olegovna Pankova (born 12 May 1991) is a Russian road bicycle racer. She was born in Semey.  She competed at the 2012 Summer Olympics in the Women's road race, finishing 38th. In 2012, she won the Tour de Feminin-O cenu Českého Švýcarska. During her career, she raced for Rusvelo and Astana - Acca Due O. She also finished second in the Russian National Road Race Championships in 2011, following on from a third place in 2010. She competed in the Women's Road Race World Championships in 2012.

References

Russian female cyclists
1991 births
Living people
Olympic cyclists of Russia
Cyclists at the 2012 Summer Olympics
Sportspeople from Semey